The Israel women's national basketball team represents Israel in international women's basketball matches and is controlled by the Israel Basketball Association. Israel have hosted the FIBA Women's EuroBasket in 1991, and will host it again in 2023 along with Slovenia, they have automatically qualified as co-host.

European Championship record

Note:Red border indicates host nation
Source:

At the Eurobasket Women 1950, Israel competed for the first time, and finished in 11th place.
Preliminary round - Group B

7th to 12th Place

At the Eurobasket Women 1991, Israel competed for the second time, the first time since 1950, and finished in 8th and last place. In addition to competing, Israel was the host of the competition.
Qualification - Group B

First Stage - Group A
After qualifying for the tournament, Israel entered the competition in Group A, and finished third.

5th to 8th places
Israel was matched up against Poland in the 5th-8th place round, losing 80-69. In the 7th-8th place round, Israel lost to Italy 78-65.

7th place

At the Eurobasket Women 1995 qualifier, Israel competed for the third time, and did not qualify.
Qualification - First stage - Group E

|}
Source:

At the Eurobasket Women 1997 qualifier, Israel competed in the qualifying round, and did not qualify.

Qualification - First stage - Group B

Qualification - Second stage - Group C

Source:

During the EuroBasket Women 1999 tournament, Israel entered the qualifier round but failed to qualify for the main tournament.

Qualifier - Group D

|}
Source:

Challenge round - Group B

|}
Source:

Source:

During the EuroBasket Women 2001 tournament, Israel entered the qualifier round but failed to qualify for the main tournament.

Qualifier - Group C

|}
Source:

Semifinals - Group A

|}
Source:

Source:

During the EuroBasket Women 2003 tournament, Israel qualified for the third time and finished in 12th place after going 0-7.

Qualifier

Preliminary Round - Group A

9th place bracket

Standings

During the EuroBasket Women 2005 tournament, Israel entered the qualifier round but failed to qualify for the main tournament.

Qualifier - Division A - Group C

|}
Source:

Additional qualifier - Group C

|}
Source:

Coach Eliyahu Rabi
Source:

During the EuroBasket Women 2007 tournament, Israel qualified for the fourth time and finished in 13th place.

In addition to competing in the tournament, Israel referee Seffi Shemmesh worked the qualifying round Group F game Serbia vs Italy, and Spain vs Russia. She also worked the classification round game France vs Lithuania.

Preliminary round - Group A

Source:

During the EuroBasket Women 2009 tournament, Israel qualified for the fifth time and finished in 13th place.

In addition to competing in the tournament, Israeli referee Seffi Shemmesh worked the following games:
 Preliminary round - Group A - Spain vs Ukraine
 Preliminary round - Group B - Latvia vs Poland
 Preliminary round - Group B - Greece vs Latvia
 Qualifying round - Group F - Belarus vs Russia
 Qualifying round - Group F - Turkey vs France
 Quarterfinals - Slovakia vs Belarus
 Finals - Russia vs France

Qualifying round - Group A

Preliminary round - Group D

During the EuroBasket Women 2011 tournament, Israel qualified for the sixth time and finished in 13th place.

In addition to Israel competing in the tournament, Israeli referee Yaari Rainisch worked the following games:
 Preliminary round - Group C - Germany vs Poland
 Preliminary round - Group D - France vs Croatia
 Preliminary round - Group D - Greece vs France
 Main round - Group F - Montenegro vs France
 Main round - Group F - France vs Poland
 Classification round - Croatia vs Latvia
 Seventh place game - Latvia vs Lithuania

Qualifying round - Group B

Preliminary round - Group B

During the EuroBasket Women 2013 tournament, Israel entered the qualifier round but failed to qualify for the main tournament.

Qualifier - Group A

Source:

Head coach Eliyahu Rabi
| asst_coach = 
Source:

During the EuroBasket Women 2015 tournament, Israel entered the qualifier round but failed to qualify for the main tournament.

In addition to competing, Israeli referee David Romano work the first leg, of the first round, finals match, between Greece and Poland.

Qualifier - First round - Group D
Israel, in addition to participating in the tournament, was also the host nation of the qualifier, with all game were played in Ramla.

|}

Knockout stage

Qualifier - Second round - Group F
During the first game of the round, Israel held an eight-point lead with eight minutes to go in the game, but ultimately fell to Croatia 76-73. During their first game against Bulgaria, Israel original trailed by eight before coming back to hold on to a 71-68 victory. During the third game of the tournament, Israel again lost to Croatia, by the score of 83-56. Israel, during their fourth game lost to Bulgaria and was officially eliminated from the tournament.

|}

Roster
The roster for EuroBasket Women 2023 qualification:

Former head coaches
 Eli Rabi
 Marik Zeltzer
Moshe Weinkrantz

See also
 Israel women's national under-19 basketball team
 Israel women's national under-17 basketball team
 Israel women's national 3x3 team
 Sports in Israel

References

External links
Official website
FIBA profile
Eurobasket.com

Basketball in Israel
Basketball teams in Israel
Women's national basketball teams
B